An Evening with Oscar Peterson is an album by Canadian jazz pianist Oscar Peterson, released in 1952 on Clef Records.

Track listing
"Caravan" (Duke Ellington, Irving Mills, Juan Tizol) – 2:52
"Summer Nocturne" (Landes) – 3:02
"Salute to Garner" (Oscar Peterson) – 2:49
"I Get a Kick Out of You" (Cole Porter) – 3:08
"What's New?" (Johnny Burke, Bob Haggart) – 3:16
"Dark Eyes" (Traditional) – 3:48
"What Is It?" (Peterson) – 3:33
"The Way You Look Tonight" (Dorothy Fields, Jerome Kern) – 2:58
"Minor Blues" (Peterson) – 3:40
"Slow Down" (Peterson) – 3:44
"How High the Moon" (Nancy Hamilton, Morgan Lewis) – 2:57
"The Nearness of You" (Hoagy Carmichael, Ned Washington) – 3:12

Personnel
Oscar Peterson – piano
Barney Kessel – guitar
Ray Brown – double bass

References

1952 albums
Oscar Peterson albums
Albums produced by Norman Granz
Clef Records albums